An ingénue is a stock character in literature, film and theatre.

Ingénue may also refer to:

 A naive person
Ingénue (album), the second solo album by k.d. lang
"Ingenue", a song on the album Amok by Atoms for Peace
Ingenue, an American teen magazine published c. 1959 – c. 2004
The Ingenues (band) all-girls vaudeville-style jazz band

See also

 Naive (disambiguation)
 L'Ingénu (1767 novella) a satirical novella by Voltaire
 Ingenu, an internet-of-things technology company